Ray Keith is a British drum and bass DJ and record producer. He is one of the genre's most well known producers and DJs and is regarded as one of the pivotal figures in the early jungle/drum and bass scene.

Biography
Ray had an interest for jazz, funk and soul music which led him to buy turntables. He began DJing as a teenager in the 1980s around his native Essex and Suffolk. This was before he got his break DJing on the London acid house and rave scene. 

He started working as a recording artist and producer for his own style of music and other genres in 1990. One of his early remixes was a bootleg mix of Orbital's Chime in 1990, which was then officially released in 1992.

He found his niche with drum and bass music. He is famed for producing bass heavy yet soulful tunes and has made classics such as the jungle anthems "Terrorist" and "Chopper". Ray set up Dread Recordings in 1994 and has produced numerous albums. He has also remixed Moby, Shades of Rhythm and Moving Shadow.

His nephew, Peter O'Grady aka Joy Orbison, is also a DJ and producer. Ray is a keen supporter of Manchester United football team

Discography

Studio albums
 Contact (UFO, 1999)
 Vintage Dread (Dread Recordings, 2000)
 Alien Encounter (UFO, 2001)
 Twisted Anger - Mothership (Dread Recordings, 2002)
 Blade Runner - Analog Bass (Dread Recordings, 2009) 
 Dread Digital Volume 1 and Volume 2 (Dread Recordings, 2010)
 I Am Renegade (Dread Recordings, 2012)
 Ray Keith vs Bladerunner - Dubplate Clash Dub Dread 4 (Dread Recordings, 2012)
 The Golden Years: Back to '94 (Kniteforce Records, 2021)

References

External links
 Discogs.com - Ray Keith

English DJs
English record producers
English drum and bass musicians
Club DJs
Remixers
Living people
Electronic dance music DJs
Musicians from Essex
Year of birth missing (living people)